Yumiko Kokonoe (九重佑三子, born 21 March 1946) is a Japanese actress and singer. Her most notable role was the protagonist of the series Comet-san filmed by Tokyo Broadcasting Corporation (TBS). 79 episodes of Comet-san were produced during 1967 and 1968 by TBS.

External links

 Japanese page about the actress/singer.

1946 births
Living people
Japanese actresses